Shelley Jensen is an American television director and producer.

He has directed episodes for a number of notable television series including The Fresh Prince of Bel-Air, Friends, Amen, What I Like About You, The Drew Carey Show, Webster, The Suite Life on Deck, Sonny with a Chance, I'm in the Band, Good Luck Charlie, Austin & Ally and other series.

Jensen won a Daytime Emmy Award in 1996 for his directing work on Disney Channel's Adventures in Wonderland winning alongside David Grossman and Gary Halvorson.

References

External links
 

American television directors
American television producers
Daytime Emmy Award winners
Living people
Place of birth missing (living people)
Year of birth missing (living people)